Cokesbury United Methodist Church is a historic Methodist church located at 13 Market Street in Onancock, Accomack County, Virginia. It was built in 1854, as a one-story, Greek Revival-style temple-front frame church. It was enlarged with a four-story, Gothic Revival entrance / bell tower with spire in 1886 and remodeled in 1892–1894. Surrounding the church on two sides is the church cemetery containing a selection of marble tombstones.

It was added to the National Register of Historic Places in 2004.  It is located in the Onancock Historic District.

References

Methodist churches in Virginia
Gothic Revival church buildings in Virginia
Churches completed in 1854
19th-century Methodist church buildings in the United States
Churches in Accomack County, Virginia
Churches on the National Register of Historic Places in Virginia
National Register of Historic Places in Accomack County, Virginia
Individually listed contributing properties to historic districts on the National Register in Virginia
1854 establishments in Virginia